A virtuoso is an individual who possesses outstanding technical ability in a particular art.

Virtuoso may also refer to:

Arts and entertainment
Virtuoso (comics), a fictional supervillain
Virtuoso (Joe Pass album), 1973
Virtuoso (David Garrett album), 2007
"Virtuoso" (Star Trek: Voyager), a 2000 episode 
Virtuoso Quartet, a British music group founded in 1924
Virtuoso (video game), 1994
The Virtuoso (play), a Restoration comedy
The Virtuoso (film), a 2021 film
Virtuoso (sculpture), a concrete sculpture by David Adickes in downtown Houston, 1988

Other uses
Virtuoso Universal Server, middleware and database engine hybrid
Aeros Virtuoso, a Ukrainian paraglider
Ricardo Virtuoso (born 1984), a Brazilian football player

See also

Mills Violano-Virtuoso, a machine manufactured by Mills Novelty Company that played a violin or piano